Phytoecia prasina is a species of beetle in the family Cerambycidae. It was described by Edmund Reitter in 1911.

References

Phytoecia
Beetles described in 1911